Nephanes titan is a beetle from the Ptiliidae family of dwarf beetles. N. titan is notable for its exceptionally small body and simple nervous system. With an average maximum body length of only a few hundred micrometers, the beetle is one of the smallest non-parasitic insects in the world.

Despite its minuscule nervous system, the beetle is still capable of associative learning.

References 

Ptiliidae
Beetles described in 1834